The 2017–18 UCF Knights women's basketball team will represent the University of Central Florida during the 2017–18 NCAA Division I basketball season. The Knights compete in Division I of the National Collegiate Athletic Association (NCAA) and the American Athletic Conference (The American). The Knights, in the program's 41st season of basketball, were led by second-year head coach Katie Abrahamson-Henderson, and play their home games at the CFE Arena on the university's main campus in Orlando, Florida. They finished the season 22–11, 12–4 in AAC play to finish in third place. They advanced to the semifinals of the American Athletic women's tournament where they lost to South Florida. They received an automatic bid to the Women's National Invitational Tournament where defeated Jacksonville in the first round before losing to Alabama in the second round.

Media
All UCF games will have an audio or video broadcast available. For conference play, UCF games will typically be available on ESPN3, AAC Digital, or UCF Knights All-Access. Road games not on ESPN3 or AAC Digital will have an audio broadcast available on the UCF Portal. All non-conference home games will be streamed exclusively on UCF Knights All-Access. Select non-conference road games will have a stream available through the opponents website. The audio broadcast for home games will only be available through UCF Knights All-Access.

Roster

Schedule and results

|-
! colspan="12" style="background:#000; color:#bc9b6a;"| Non-conference regular season

|-
! colspan="12" style="background:#000; color:#bc9b6a;"| AAC regular season

|-
! colspan="12" style="background:#000;"| AAC Women's Tournament

|-
! colspan="12" style="background:#000000;"| WNIT

Rankings
2017–18 NCAA Division I women's basketball rankings

See also
 2017–18 UCF Knights men's basketball team

References

External links
 Official Team Website

UCF
UCF Knights women's basketball seasons
UCF
UICF Knights
UICF Knights